is a passenger railway station in located in the city of Higashiōsaka,  Osaka Prefecture, Japan, operated by the private railway operator Kintetsu Railway.  It is perpendicular to, but not connected with, the JR West JR-Kawachi-Eiwa Station.

Lines
Kawachi-Eiwa Station is served by the Nara Line, and is located 0.8 rail kilometers from the starting point of the line at Fuse Station and 6.9 kilometers from Ōsaka Namba Station.

Station layout
The station consists of two opposed elevated side platforms, with the station building underneath.

Platforms

Adjacent stations

History
It was renamed to its present name on March 15, 1941. In 1941 it was transferred to the Kansai Kyūkō Railway, which became part of Kintetsu in 1944.

Passenger statistics
In fiscal 2018, the station was used by an average of 10,987 passengers daily.

Surrounding area
Higashi Osaka Legal Joint Government Building
Higashi Osaka Ward Prosecutor's Office
Osaka Legal Affairs Bureau Higashi Osaka Branch
Higashi Osaka Simple Court
Higashi Osaka Tax Office

See also
List of railway stations in Japan

References

External links

 Kawachi-Eiwa Station 

Railway stations in Osaka Prefecture
Railway stations in Japan opened in 1936
Higashiōsaka